The men's 200 metres was the second-shortest of the men's track races in the Athletics at the 1964 Summer Olympics program in Tokyo. 63 athletes from 48 nations entered, with 6 not starting in the first round. The maximum number of athletes per nation had been set at 3 since the 1930 Olympic Congress. The first two rounds were held on 16 October, with the semifinals and the final on 17 October. The event was won by Henry Carr of the United States, the nation's 11th victory in the event. Fellow American Paul Drayton took silver; it was the fifth time in six Games that the United States had the top two finishers. Edwin Roberts gave Trinidad and Tobago its first medal in the men's 200 metres with his bronze.

Background

This was the 14th appearance of the event, which was not held at the first Olympics in 1896 but has been on the program ever since. Two of the six finalists from the 1960 Games returned: gold medalist Livio Berruti of Italy and fourth-place finisher Marian Foik of Poland. The American team, however, was favored: Henry Carr had won the AAU championship in 1964, Paul Drayton had won in 1961 and 1962, and the two had tied in 1963. Carr held the world record of 20.2 seconds (set in a 220 yards race).

Cameroon, Colombia, Hong Kong, Iran, Madagascar, Northern Rhodesia, Rhodesia, and Senegal each made their debut in the event. The United States made its 14th appearance, the only nation to have competed at each edition of the 200 metres to date.

Competition format

The competition used the four round format introduced in 1920: heats, quarterfinals, semifinals, and a final. The "fastest loser" system introduced in 1960 was not used, with the number of heats in each round make it unnecessary. The 1964 competition made the 8 person heat standard.

There were 8 heats of between 7 and 8 runners each (before withdrawals), with the top 4 men in each advancing to the quarterfinals. The quarterfinals consisted of 4 heats of 8 athletes each; the 4 fastest men in each heat advanced to the semifinals. There were 2 semifinals, each with 8 runners. Again, the top 4 athletes advanced. The final had 8 runners. The races were run on a 400 metre track.

Records

Prior to the competition, the existing world and Olympic records were as follows.

Paul Drayton matched the Olympic record of 20.5 seconds in the first semifinal. He ran the same time in the final, but Henry Carr won in 20.3 seconds to set a new Olympic record.

Schedule

All times are Japan Standard Time (UTC+9)

Results

Heats

The top four runners in each of the 8 heats advanced.

Heat 1

Heat 2

Heat 3

Heat 4

Heat 5

Heat 6

Heat 7

Heat 8

Quarterfinals

The four fastest runners in each of the four heats advanced to the semifinals.

Quarterfinal 1

Quarterfinal 2

Quarterfinal 3

Quarterfinal 4

Semifinals

The top four runners in each of the two semifinals qualified for the final.

Semifinal 1

Drayton tied the Olympic record in this semifinal, three-tenths of a second short of the world record.

Semifinal 2

The second semifinal was the fourth race of the 200 metres in which an American won and an Italian took second place.

Final

Drayton matched his semifinal time, which had tied the Olympic record at 20.5 seconds, but Carr did even better, setting a new Olympic record of 20.3 seconds to bump Drayton to the silver medal. Carr's time was only one-tenth of a second off the world record.

References

Athletics at the 1964 Summer Olympics
200 metres at the Olympics
Men's events at the 1964 Summer Olympics